Sun Lu-t'ang or Sun Lutang (1860-1933) was a renowned master of Chinese neijia (internal) martial arts and was the progenitor of the syncretic art of Sun-style t'ai chi ch'uan. He was also considered an accomplished Neo-Confucian and Taoist scholar (especially in the I Ching), and was a distinguished contributor to the theory of internal martial arts through his many published works.

Biography
He was born in Hebei and was named Sun Fuquan by his parents.  Years later, his Baguazhang teacher Cheng Tinghua gave him the name Sun Lutang.  (It was common in old China for people to have multiple names).  He continued to use his original name in some areas, including the publishing of his books.

He was also well-versed in two other internal martial arts: xingyiquan (hsing-i ch'uan) and baguazhang (pa-kua chang) before he came to study taijiquan (t'ai chi ch'uan). His expertise in these two martial arts were so high that many regarded him as without equal. Sun learned Wu (Hao)-style t'ai chi ch'uan from Hao Wei-chen.  Sun started studying with Hao relatively late in his life, but his accomplishments in the other two internal arts led him to develop his t'ai chi abilities to a high standard more quickly than is usual.

He subsequently was invited by Yang Shao-hou, Yang Chengfu and Wu Chien-ch'üan to join them on the faculty of the Beijing Physical Education Research Institute where they taught t'ai chi to the public after 1914. Sun taught there until 1928, a seminal period in the development of modern Yang, Wu and Sun-style t'ai chi ch'uan.

Family
In 1891 he married Zhang Zhouxian, with whom he had three sons and a daughter.
 First son, Sun Xingyi (孫星一; 1891-1929)
 Second son, Sun Cunzhou (孫存周; 1893-1963)
 Third son, Sun Wuzi (孫务滋; 1897-1922)
 Daughter, Sun Jianyun (孫劍雲; 1913-2003)

Teachers
 Xingyiquan from Li Kuiyuan, and later from Guo Yunshen (from 1882).
 Baguazhang from Cheng Tinghua (from 1891).
 Wu (Hao)-style taijiquan from Hao Wei-chen (from 1911).

T'ai chi ch'uan lineage tree with Sun-style focus

Publications
In later life, he published five martial arts texts which were also later translated to English recently:

Xingyiquan xue (A study of form mind boxing) 1915
Baguaquan xue (A study of eight trigrams boxing) 1916
Taijiquan xue (A study of grand ultimate boxing) 1921
Baguajian xue (A study of eight trigrams straight sword) 1927
Quanyi Shuzhen (An explanation of the essence of boxing)

He also wrote a study of Bagua spear, though this was never published.

References

External links
Sun-style website
Sun-style researched
Sun-style Forum
Sun's Tai Chi Research Institute - seccion sudamerica
(Wayback Machine copy)

1860 births
1933 deaths
Chinese baguazhang practitioners
Chinese tai chi practitioners
Chinese xingyiquan practitioners
Martial arts school founders
Sportspeople from Baoding
Martial arts writers